RCAF Station Gimli was an air station of the Royal Canadian Air Force (RCAF) located near Gimli, Manitoba, Canada.

World War II (1943–1945)
On September 6, 1943, the British Commonwealth Air Training Plan established No. 18 Service Flying Training School (No. 18 SFTS) to train aircrew for Second World War operations using the Avro Anson. No. 18 SFTS ceased operation on May 30, 1945.

Aerodrome data c.1942
Six runways were listed as under construction and detailed as follows:

Relief landing field – Netley, MB (1942)
The only Relief Landing field for RCAF Station Gimli was located approximately 10 Miles South on the west side of the hamlet of Netley, Manitoba.  The Relief field was constructed in the typical triangular pattern. 
Three runways were listed as under construction and detailed as follows:

On a recent drive by the site of the Netley Relief Landing Field (May 2018) there is little trace of the aerodrome from the ground but the former runways can be made out from the satellite imagery available on google maps.

Cold War (1950–1971)
During the Cold War period, many Second World War air stations were reactivated. Gimli was one of these, and was reopened in 1950 to become a jet aircraft training station. Flying training schools located here include No. 2 Flying Training School, No. 3 Advanced Flying School (redesignated in 1964 to No. 1 Flying Training School), and No. 1 Advanced Flying Training School.
Married Quarters were built on the base at some point during this period.  The former married Quarters are now the community of Aspen Park.
At some point after the Base was re-opened the Runways were reconfigured from the 6 runway triangular pattern to 2 longer, roughly parallel, asphalt surfaces.
After unification of the three services in 1968, RCAF Station Gimli became a Canadian Forces Base (CFB). CFB Gimli closed in September 1971 and the flying schools moved to other Canadian forces bases.

Post closure
Part of the aerodrome is now used as an industrial park and a racetrack, but part continues operation as the Gimli Industrial Park Airport.  Flying related activities include use by Manitoba Provincial Government water bomber squadron, the  Regional Gliding School (Northwest), and two private flying schools. Gimli is also used by No. 435 Transport and Rescue Squadron based at 17 Wing Winnipeg, for training purposes.

Air Canada Flight 143 (Gimli Glider)

The Gimli airfield became the focus of international attention on Saturday, July 23, 1983, when Air Canada Flight 143 made an emergency landing there after a 17-minute powerless glide due to fuel exhaustion. On that day, the runways were being used for race-car activities on 'Family Day' for the Sports Car club from Winnipeg. Flight 143's captain executed a sideslip, before touching down on the tarmac. None of 69 people on board the Boeing 767 aircraft were seriously injured, because the impact with the ground was minimized by the reduced landing speed provided by the slip that increase drag and caused the airplane to quickly reduce speed and to lose altitude. This maneuver is commonly used with gliders and light aircraft but was a first with a commercial aircraft.

See also 
 Gimli Industrial Park Airport
 Gimli Motorsports Park

References 

Gimli
Gimli
Military airbases in Manitoba
Military history of Manitoba
Canadian Forces bases in Canada (closed)
Buildings and structures in Gimli, Manitoba